Inaamulhaq (born 14 November 1979) is an Indian actor and screenwriter who has been part of several commercial and critically acclaimed Bollywood films, including Filmistaan, Jolly LLB 2 and Airlift. In 2019 Inaamulhaq has bagged the Best Actor Award at the DCSAFF (Washington DC South Asian Film Festival) for outstanding performance in his film Nakkash. and Best Actor Award at India International Film Festival of Boston (IIFFB) 2019.

He has written for TV shows including Comedy Circus and dialogue for the Hindi film Bbuddah... Hoga Terra Baap.

Early life and education

Born in Saharanpur (Uttar Pradesh, India), Inaamulhaq first appeared on stage at the age of twelve. Later, he joined the Indian People's Theatre Association (IPTA) in Saharanpur, and acted in numerous plays as a lead.  In 2003, he graduated from the National School of Drama (NSD) New Delhi, with specialization in acting.

Career
In Mumbai he started his career as a writer for season 2 of Karamchand, directed by Pankaj Parashar.

After working as a scriptwriter and creative consultant with Comedy Circus for two and a half years, he moved into films and wrote dialogue for Bbuddah... Hoga Terra Baap in 2011.

As an actor, he got his first film break with the critically acclaimed Firaaq in 2008. His first major role in a feature film was as the Pakistani national Aaftab, in Nitin Kakkar's  National Award winner Filmistaan (2012), for which he was named in the "Top 10 Stand-Out Actors of 2014" by Mid-Day, and "The Most Prominent Debuts of 2014" by IBNlive.com in their Year-ender 2014. He is also listed in IMDB'S Top 200 Best Indian Actors and Actresses. Madhureeta Mukherjee from Times of India wrote: "Inaamulhaq piques the emotions with perfection. The camaraderie between the pure souls who understand only the language of Bollywood is heart-warming". Shubha Shetty-Saha  from Mid-Day praised him saying: "But it is Inaamulhaq, who steals your heart with the most natural, endearing performance".

Inaamulhaq appeared in the Askhay Kumar-starrer Airlift. He plays the role of an Iraqi Major Kahalf Bin Zayd, who is the main antagonist of the evacuation that the film is based on. Airlift is one of the biggest success of the actor and his performance in Airlift received a positive review from the critics. 'Airlift was released 22 January 2016. Bollywood Hungama praised him in their review saying: "Inaamulhaq as the Amitabh Bachchan fan Iraqi Major Khalaf Bin Zayd is a delight". Critic Komal Nahta from ETC Bollywood Business stated in his review: "Inaamulhaq is entertaining as the Iraqi major".

His played a cameo in Jolly LLB 2 as a Kashmiri. Mentioning about Inaamulhaq's performance in Jolly LLB-2 review, Sudhir Redkar from KoiMoi.com wrote: "Inaamulhaq has a small cameo that turns out to be an interesting twist". Anna MM Vetticad from FirstPost,com wrote: "Watch Inaamulhaq playing a Kashmiri pronounce "card" differently within a span of a few seconds". He also appeared in Lucknow Central and Firangi and Phullu in and was praised for his performance. Sukanya Verma from Rediff.com praised Inaamulhaq’s performance in Phullu quoting "No wonder a brief cameo by Inaamulhaq, once again reiterating his appeal in showy, idiosyncratic characters, makes more sense that most of this movie".

Inaamulhaq's film Nakkash was released on limited screens on 31 May 2019, in which he played the lead role.  The first look poster of Nakkash was unveiled at India Pavilion of the Cannes Film Festival 2018. Pallabi Dey Purkayastha wrote in her The Times of India review "The protagonist, played by Inaamulhaq, is a revelation and his chemistry with his on-screen son almost evokes a sense of resentment towards the society we live in, mainly because of the unfair treatment that they are subjected to". Saibal Chatterjee from NDTV quotes "Inaamulhaq does full justice to his first-ever lead role in a Hindi film, getting into the skin of the conflicted central character with complete conviction".

For his performance in Nakkash Inaamulhaq bagged the Best Actor Award at the 8th Annual DCSAFF (Washington DC South Asian Film Festival 2018) . and Best Actor Award at India International Film Festival of Boston (IIFFB) 2019.

Inaamulhaq was seen in Nikkhil Advani's web series Hasmukh produced by Applause Entertainment. currently streaming on Netflix.

He also appeared in Maharani (web series) as Bengali bureaucrat Parvez Aalam. Where he got great reception from the audience and critics as well. The show is created by Subhash Kapoor and streaming on SonyLIV

Personal life
Inaamulhaq is married to Shibli Anwer. The couple have a son Ivaan.

Filmography

Actor 
 Firaaq (2008) as Munna
 Filmistaan (2014) as Aftaab
 Chidiya (Cameo)
 Airlift (2016) as Major Khalaf Bin Zayd
 Jolly LLB 2 (2017) as Mohammed Iqbal Quadri
 Phullu (2017) (cameo)
 Lucknow Central (2017) as Dikkat Ansari
 Firangi (2017) as Heera
 Nakkash (2019) as Allah Rakha Siddiqui
 Pagalpanti (2019) as Niraj Modi
 Hasmukh (Web-Series) (2020) as Daroga
 Maharani (web series) (2021) as Bihar Finance Secretary, Parvez Aalam 
Mere Desh Ki Dharti (2022)

Writer 

 Bbuddah... Hoga Terra Baap (2011) (dialogue writer)
 Screwed Up (Web Series) (2018) (additional dialogue writer).

Awards
 Won
 Best Actor Award for Nakkash at IIFFB (India International Film Festival Of Boston 2019)
 Best Actor Award for Nakkash at DCSAFF (Washington DC South Asian Film Festival 2018)
 Jury Award for outstanding performance in Nakkash at Lifft India Filmotsav-World Cine Fest 2019
 Best Actor in a Supporting Role for Filmistaan at 21st Annual Screen Awards
 Best Actor in a Supporting Role for Filmistaan at IBNLive Movie Awards (2015)
 Best Actor in a Supporting Role for Filmistaan at SICA Awards (2015)
 Best Actor in a Supporting Role for Filmistaan at AIBA Awards (2015)

 Nominated
 Best Actor in a Supporting Role for Filmistaan'' at IIFA Awards 2015

Short films

Inaamulhaq directed two short films – "The Search" (2005) which got nominated for the Best Film Award in competition category at Berlin Asia-Pacific Film Festival-2006 (Germany), and "Parchhaiyaan" (2004), based on an anti-War poem by renowned poet Sahir Ludhianvi.

Television

Theatre
(In alphabetical order)

References

External links

1979 births
Living people
People from Saharanpur
Indian male film actors
Male actors in Hindi cinema
National School of Drama alumni
Screen Awards winners